Dean Williams (born 22 April 1956 in Perth, Western Australia) is a retired squash player from Australia. He was one of the leading players in the game in the late-1970s and 1980s, reaching a career–high world ranking of World No. 3 in 1984.

In 1982, Williams finished runner–up at the World Open, losing in the final to the legendary Pakistani player Jahangir Khan 9–2, 6–9, 9–1, 9–1.

Since retiring from the top-level game, Williams has worked as a squash coach and remained active in seniors tournaments.

References

Australian male squash players
Living people
1956 births
20th-century Australian people
21st-century Australian people